Richard Rolland Kenney (September 9, 1856 – August 14, 1931) was an American lawyer and politician from Dover, in Kent County, Delaware. He was a member of the Democratic Party who was a U.S. Senator from Delaware.

Early life and family
Kenney was born in Laurel, Delaware. He attended public schools and Laurel Academy, and graduated in 1878 from Hobart College in Geneva, New York. Subsequently, he studied the law, was admitted to the bar in 1881, and began a practice in Dover, Delaware.

Professional and political career
Kenney was the State Librarian from 1879 until 1881. He was also Captain in the National Guard from 1880 until 1889, and Adjutant General of the state from 1887 until 1891. In 1896 he became a member of the Democratic National Committee.

He was elected to the U.S. Senate on January 19, 1897. He filled the vacancy in the term commencing March 4, 1895, caused by the ongoing Addicks controversy. During this term, he served with the Democratic minority in the 54th, 55th, and 56th Congress. The Democrats were unable to secure his reelection in 1901, and the seat became vacant again. In all, he served from January 19, 1897 until March 4, 1901, during the administration of U.S. President William McKinley.

Following his term, Kenney resumed the practice of law in Dover. Later, during the World War I, he served in the Judge Advocate General’s Department. In 1921 he was elected counsel to the Delaware House of Representatives, elected prosecuting attorney by the levy court of Kent County, and appointed a member of the State board of supplies. He was also member and secretary of the State public lands commission from 1913 until 1929.

Death and legacy
Kenney died at Dover and is buried there in the Christ Episcopal Church Cemetery.

Almanac
The General Assembly chose the U.S. Senators, who took office March 4th for a six-year term.

Notes

References

Images
Biographical Directory of the United States

External links

Biographical Directory of the United States
Delaware’s Members of Congress 

The Political Graveyard

1856 births
1931 deaths
American Episcopalians
People from Dover, Delaware
Hobart and William Smith Colleges alumni
Delaware lawyers
Delaware Democrats
Democratic Party United States senators from Delaware
Burials in Dover, Delaware
People from Laurel, Delaware